Jamalpur Assembly constituency is an assembly constituency in Purba Bardhaman district in the Indian state of West Bengal. It is reserved for scheduled castes.

Overview
As per orders of the Delimitation Commission, No. 262 Jamalpur (SC) assembly constituency covers Jamalpur community development block and Mugura gram panchayat of Raina I community development block.

Jamalpur assembly segment was earlier part of Burdwan (Lok Sabha constituency). As per orders of Delimitation Commission it is part of No. 38 Bardhaman Purba (Lok Sabha constituency).

Members of Legislative Assembly

Election results

2021

2016

 

Samar Hazra, originally belonging to the MFB party, fought and won in this election with the symbol of CPI (M).

2011

 

.# Swing calculated on Congress+Trinamool Congress vote percentages taken together in 2006.

1977-2006
In 2006, 2001, 1996 and 1991, Samar Hazra, Marxist Forward Bloc won the Jamalpur (SC) assembly seat defeating his nearest rivals, Shankar Chandra Mallick of Trinamool Congress, Ajay Pramanik of Trinamool Congress,  Baidyanath Das of Congress and Ajay Pramnik of Congress, in the respective years. Contests in most years were multi cornered but only winners and runners are being mentioned. In 1987, 1982 and 1977, Sunil Santra, MFB, defeated Puranjoy Pramanik of Congress/ ICS.

1962-1972
Puranjoy Pramanik of Congress won the seat in 1972. Kalipada Das of MFB won the seat in 1971. Basudeb Pramanik of Bangla Congress won the seat in 1969. Puranjoy Pramanik of Congress won the seat in 1967. Mrityunjoy Pramanik of Congress won the seat in 1962. Prior to that the seat did not exist.

References

Politics of Paschim Bardhaman district
Assembly constituencies of West Bengal
Politics of Purba Bardhaman district